Spyro: Enter the Dragonfly is a 2002 platform video game released for the PlayStation 2 and GameCube, developed by Equinoxe Digital Entertainment and Check Six Studios; and published by Universal Interactive.  It is the fourth main installment in the Spyro series. It is the first to be released for the console and the first to not be developed by the series creator, Insomniac Games. 

Named for the companions of the dragons in the setting, Enter the Dragonfly concerns Spyro's contention with the return of the antagonist Ripto and his attempted abduction of 90 magical dragonflies. 

Critical reception of the game was mixed due to its short length, lack of originality, and numerous technical issues. This was caused by creative disagreements with the publisher and time constraints to meet the holiday 2002 deadline.

Gameplay

The player controls Spyro the dragon, who is accompanied by his dragonfly partner Sparx. Spyro is able to breathe fire, charge, glide, hover, and swim. New to the series is the introduction of multiple breath attacks, such as bubble breath, ice breath, and electric breath. Spyro is also able to learn a block technique which can be used to deflect ranged attacks back at enemies. These abilities are attained from the ancient dragon statue in the home world by collecting magical runes. Additionally, some levels involve the operation of aircraft or other vehicles.

Plot
The story continues from the events of Year of the Dragon with a rite of passage for the young dragons and the arrival of new young dragonfly guardians to assist them.

During the event, Ripto, who was the antagonist of Ripto's Rage, enters via a magical portal with his henchmen and disrupts the celebration. His intent is to capture all of the dragonflies, thus weakening the power of every dragon and thereby get his revenge upon Spyro, but his spell misfires, and the dragonflies become scattered throughout the Dragon Realms.

Spyro recovers the dragonflies by capturing them in the environment with his bubble breath ability and completing tasks for NPCs. After collecting all of the lost dragonflies, Spyro fights and defeats Ripto, who retreats whence he came.

Development
Upon completion of the original Spyro trilogy for Sony PlayStation, the original developer Insomniac Games ceased production on the franchise and moved onto developing the Ratchet & Clank games. After the publishing agreement between Sony Computer Entertainment and Universal Interactive Studios ended in April 2000, Universal Interactive, who owned the Spyro intellectual property, was consolidated into Havas Interactive the following year, becoming a publishing label within the company and announced plans to bring an original Spyro game to the Xbox, PlayStation 2, PC, and Game Boy Advance. Universal contracted two California-based studios to develop the game: Equinoxe Digital Entertainment, responsible for the game's art, and Check Six Studios, who handled its design and programming.

Joel Goodsell, a game designer who had previously worked on the Disney Interactive Studios titles Gargoyles and Toy Story 2: Buzz Lightyear to the Rescue, joined the project after seeing a Spyro-themed demo they developed. Goodsell served as the original project lead and felt that Spyro needed a "tone update" going from PS1 to PS2. The developers initially created a darker, more adult take on Spyro, integrating steampunk visuals into the design and art. Based on Universal's feedback, the game was rewritten to be more traditional, with a plot involving Gnasty Gnorc and Ripto, antagonists from the previous games, teaming up and demanding revenge on Spyro. Universal replied that the game was "just a standard Spyro game design", asking what was special about it. Goodsell then wrote "an epic Zelda-esque RPG-lite Spyro design" including a hub-town and surrounding open world field with changing seasons. Universal signed off on this design in January 2002, leaving no feedback. Spyro: Enter the Dragonfly for the PS2 was unveiled on February 19, 2002, at Vivendi Universal Games' First Annual Games Fair in France; a GameCube version was confirmed in July.

Several months into the game's development, Check Six and Equinoxe moved into a single office space in Venice, California. The game struggled with low framerates, even as the visuals were simplified. Check Six had difficulty paying their developers, missing paychecks, and the team was also pressured to release the game in time for the Christmas season. Goodsell felt that having two directors on the team, including Ricci Rukavina of Universal Interactive, hurt the team's morale and was a drain on Check Six's limited financial resources, he subsequently left the studio.

Stewart Copeland, composer of the previous three Spyro games as well as Enter the Dragonfly stated he started to feel a "divergence" with Universal Interactive, stating "I remember the team came in to create the promotional materials for Enter The Dragonfly. They showed me an ad they had, which I didn’t even recognize as Spyro. It was country and western-themed, and I think that’s where the divergence happened for me. We were not on the same page any more."

Spyro: Enter the Dragonfly was the only game developed by Check Six and Equinoxe before they closed down. Check Six was working on Aliens: Colonial Marines simultaneously with Spyro, which was cancelled due to performance and production issues. Equinoxe developed a prototype for a Nintendo game "that had a lot of promise, but Nintendo elected to not continue funding it after one particular milestone."

Reception

The PlayStation 2 version of the game received "mixed or average" reviews and the GameCube version received "generally unfavorable" reviews, according to the review aggregation website Metacritic.

IGN said of the PS2 version, "Enter the Dragonfly is essentially a replica game, a side step or a lateral move rather than a step forward. So, what it comes down to is this: Are you up for more of the exact same Spyro game?" Ted Price, the President of Insomniac Games, even spoke out about how bad he found the game. In an interview, he stated, "Spyro has become an abused stepchild... Spyro: Enter the Dragonfly on PS2 and GameCube was an absolute travesty."

A large body of criticism for the game was caused by its numerous bugs and glitches. Some reviewers speculated that this was caused by a rushed development cycle to reach a scheduled release date. Matthew Gallant, writing for GameSpot, said, "Even the biggest fans of Spyro are going to have a hard time enjoying this game. The leap to the latest generation of consoles leaves them with a slower game, a shorter game (10 hours), and an all-around less enjoyable game, not to mention a buggy one." Critics also reported that the technical issues extended to sound. Gamershell claimed: "Let's remember some basic school knowledge first: sounds that originate from far away are more silent than sounds which are near us. Not so in Spyro. Something went very wrong with the sound positioning system. Sounds from far away often sound like they are directly in front of you."

Another criticism of the game was the framerate. Ben Kosmina of Nintendo World Report said, "While running around the Dragon Realms (the overworld of the game) if there's too many sheep or moving characters on screen, the game will skip frames excessively. It also happens while running or flying through levels where there are a lot of characters, and even sometimes when there aren't any characters in the area! This is just unacceptable." IGN shared this complaint, adding "The framerate suffers often, chugging from around a maximum of 30 fps downward, depending on the area. Which is kind of strange, because these worlds aren't much bigger than those on the PlayStation versions of Spyro. There aren't many more enemies on screen, and the textures are still the same, simple flat shaded swaths of primary colours, just like the others. Oftentimes, entire areas pop in because of weird problems with load issues."

Critics also had issues with control and collision detection. Kosmina mentioned, "Due to the awful control you have over Spyro when he's flying, you'll be plummeting off cliffs, missing switches you're trying to ground pound, swerving all over the place while trying to land properly and falling off small platforms for no reason at all."

The GameCube version was a runner-up for the "Worst Game on GameCube" award at GameSpots Best and Worst of 2002 Awards, which went to Jeremy McGrath Supercross World.

The PlayStation 2 version received a "Platinum" sales award from the Entertainment and Leisure Software Publishers Association (ELSPA), indicating sales of at least 300,000 units in the UK.

Legal issues
On March 28, 2007, a lawsuit was filed against Universal, Check Six, Equinoxe and Sony by the parents of a child who suffered epileptic seizures after playing Enter The Dragonfly.

References

External links
 

2002 video games
3D platform games
GameCube games
PlayStation 2 games
Spyro the Dragon video games
Video game sequels
Video games with 2.5D graphics
Single-player video games
Universal Interactive games
Video games developed in the United States
Video games scored by Stewart Copeland